The Bearden Independent School District is a school district based in Bearden, Oklahoma United States. It consists of Bearden Public School that supports more than 100 students in kindergarten through grade 8.

See also
 List of school districts in Oklahoma

References

External links
 
 Bearden Overview

School districts in Oklahoma
Public elementary schools in Oklahoma
Education in Okfuskee County, Oklahoma